Ned Wayburn's Town Topics was a musical comedy revue that ran at the Century Theatre from 23 September 1915 to 20 November 1915.  It was written Harry B. Smith, Thomas J. Gray and Robert B. Smith and composed by Harold Orlob.

External links

1915 musicals
Broadway musicals